Stanimir Marinov (born 7 September 1991) is a Bulgarian professional basketball player. He currently plays for Spartak  of the Bulgarian National Basketball League.

Bulgarian national team
Marinov is a member of Bulgarian national team. He appeared for his country's team six times during the EuroBasket 2015 Second Qualifying Round, where he averaged 23.5 minutes, 2.7 assists, 2.5 rebounds and 1 steal per game.

References

1991 births
Living people
BC Balkan Botevgrad players
BC Cherkaski Mavpy players
BC Levski Sofia players
Bulgarian men's basketball players
CS Universitatea Cluj-Napoca (men's basketball) players
KB Prishtina players
People from Silistra
Point guards
Shooting guards